Proprioseiopsis is a genus of mites in the family Phytoseiidae.

Species

 Proprioseiopsis acalyphae Denmark & Evans, in Denmark, Evans, Aguilar, Vargas & Ochoa 1999
 Proprioseiopsis acapius Karg, 1976
 Proprioseiopsis amotus (Zack, 1969)
 Proprioseiopsis amplus (Wainstein, 1983)
 Proprioseiopsis anthurii (Schicha, 1993)
 Proprioseiopsis antonellii Congdon, 2002
 Proprioseiopsis arunachalensis (Gupta, 1986)
 Proprioseiopsis asetus (Chant, 1959)
 Proprioseiopsis athiasae (Hirschmann, 1962)
 Proprioseiopsis badryi (Yousef & El-Brollosy, 1986)
 Proprioseiopsis basis Karg, 1994
 Proprioseiopsis bay (Schicha, 1980)
 Proprioseiopsis beatus (Chaudhri, 1968)
 Proprioseiopsis belizensis (Yoshida-Shaul & Chant, 1991)
 Proprioseiopsis bordjelaini (Athias-Henriot, 1966)
 Proprioseiopsis borealis (Chant & Hansell, 1971)
 Proprioseiopsis bregetovae (Abbasova, 1970)
 Proprioseiopsis bulga Chaudhri, Akbar & Rasool, 1979
 Proprioseiopsis cabonus (Schicha & Elshafie, 1980)
 Proprioseiopsis caliensis (Moraes & Mesa, 1988)
 Proprioseiopsis campanulus Karg, 1979
 Proprioseiopsis cannaensis (Muma, 1962)
 Proprioseiopsis carolinianus (Muma, Metz & Farrier, 1967)
 Proprioseiopsis catinus Karg, 1976
 Proprioseiopsis cephaeli (De Leon, 1967)
 Proprioseiopsis chilosus (van der Merwe, 1968)
 Proprioseiopsis circulus Tuttle & Muma, 1973
 Proprioseiopsis citri (Muma, 1962)
 Proprioseiopsis clausae (Muma, 1962)
 Proprioseiopsis coniferus (Prasad, 1968)
 Proprioseiopsis dacus (Wainstein, 1973)
 Proprioseiopsis dahonagnas (Schicha & Corpuz-Raros, 1992)
 Proprioseiopsis dentatus Chaudhri, Akbar & Rasool, 1979
 Proprioseiopsis detritus (Muma, 1961)
 Proprioseiopsis dominigos (El-Banhawy, 1984)
 Proprioseiopsis donchanti (Athias-Henriot, 1967)
 Proprioseiopsis dorsatus (Muma, 1961)
 Proprioseiopsis edbakeri (Athias-Henriot, 1967)
 Proprioseiopsis eudentatus Karg, 1989
 Proprioseiopsis euflagellatus Karg, 1983
 Proprioseiopsis eurynotus (van der Merwe, 1968)
 Proprioseiopsis euscutatus Karg, 1983
 Proprioseiopsis exitus (Schuster, 1966)
 Proprioseiopsis exopodalis (Kennett, 1958)
 Proprioseiopsis farallonicus (Moraes & Mesa, 1991)
 Proprioseiopsis ferratus Karg, 1976
 Proprioseiopsis fragariae (Kennett, 1958)
 Proprioseiopsis gallus Karg, 1989
 Proprioseiopsis gelikmani (Wainstein & Arutunjan, 1970)
 Proprioseiopsis genitalis Karg, 1976
 Proprioseiopsis gerezianus (Athias-Henriot, 1966)
 Proprioseiopsis globosus (Gonzalez & Schuster, 1962)
 Proprioseiopsis globosus Karg, 1976
 Proprioseiopsis gracilisetae (Muma, 1962)
 Proprioseiopsis grovesae (Chant, 1959)
 Proprioseiopsis guatemalensis (Chant, 1959)
 Proprioseiopsis hawaiiensis (Wainstein, 1983)
 Proprioseiopsis hudsonianus (Chant & Hansell, 1971)
 Proprioseiopsis inflatus (De Leon, 1965)
 Proprioseiopsis involutus Denmark & Knisley, in Knisley & Denmark 1978
 Proprioseiopsis iorgius Karg, 1976
 Proprioseiopsis isocaudarum Karg, 1993
 Proprioseiopsis jasmini (El-Banhawy, 1984)
 Proprioseiopsis jugortus (Athias-Henriot, 1966)
 Proprioseiopsis kogi (Chant & Hansell, 1971)
 Proprioseiopsis kopaeus (Schicha & Corpuz-Raros, 1992)
 Proprioseiopsis latocavi Karg, 1998
 Proprioseiopsis latoscutatus Karg, 1976
 Proprioseiopsis lenis (Corpuz-Raros & Rimando, 1966)
 Proprioseiopsis lepidus (Chant, 1959)
 Proprioseiopsis levani (Gomelauri, 1968)
 Proprioseiopsis lichenis (Chant, 1959)
 Proprioseiopsis lineatus (Wu & Lan, 1991)
 Proprioseiopsis marginatus Denmark, 1974
 Proprioseiopsis marrubiae Tuttle & Muma, 1973
 Proprioseiopsis mauiensis (Prasad, 1968)
 Proprioseiopsis messor (Wainstein, 1960)
 Proprioseiopsis mexicanus (Garman, 1958)
 Proprioseiopsis miconiae (Moraes & Mesa, 1991)
 Proprioseiopsis missouriensis Poe, 1970
 Proprioseiopsis mumaellus (Athias-Henriot, 1967)
 Proprioseiopsis mumamacrosetae (Hirschmann, 1962)
 Proprioseiopsis nemotoi (Ehara & Amano, 1998)
 Proprioseiopsis neomexicanus (Chant, 1959)
 Proprioseiopsis neotropicus (Ehara, 1966)
 Proprioseiopsis oblatus (Muma, 1961)
 Proprioseiopsis okanagensis (Chant, 1957)
 Proprioseiopsis oregonensis (Garman, 1958)
 Proprioseiopsis ovatus (Garman, 1958)
 Proprioseiopsis ovicinctus (Athias-Henriot, 1961)
 Proprioseiopsis pascuus (van der Merwe, 1968)
 Proprioseiopsis patellae Karg, 1989
 Proprioseiopsis penai Denmark & Evans, in Denmark, Evans, Aguilar, Vargas & Ochoa 1999
 Proprioseiopsis pentagonalis (Moraes & Mesa, 1991)
 Proprioseiopsis pentagonus (Wu & Lan, 1995)
 Proprioseiopsis penurisetus (Wainstein, 1960)
 Proprioseiopsis peruvianus (Moraes & Mesa, 1991)
 Proprioseiopsis phaseoloides Denmark & Evans, in Denmark, Evans, Aguilar, Vargas & Ochoa 1999
 Proprioseiopsis pocillatus (Athias-Henriot, 1961)
 Proprioseiopsis poculus Tuttle & Muma, 1973
 Proprioseiopsis popularis (De Leon, 1962)
 Proprioseiopsis praeanalis Karg, 1989
 Proprioseiopsis precipitans (De Leon, 1962)
 Proprioseiopsis pubes (Tseng, 1976)
 Proprioseiopsis pusillus (Kennett, 1963)
 Proprioseiopsis putmani (Chant, 1959)
 Proprioseiopsis putrephilus Meshkov, 1999
 Proprioseiopsis reventus (Zack, 1969)
 Proprioseiopsis rosellus (Chant, 1959)
 Proprioseiopsis rotundus (Muma, 1961)
 Proprioseiopsis sarraceniae (Muma, 1965)
 Proprioseiopsis scurra (Wainstein & Beglyarov, 1971)
 Proprioseiopsis septa (Garman, 1958)
 Proprioseiopsis sexsetosus (Fox, 1949)
 Proprioseiopsis sharkiensis Basha & Yousef, 1999
 Proprioseiopsis sharovi (Wainstein, 1975)
 Proprioseiopsis solens (De Leon, 1962)
 Proprioseiopsis sororculus (Wainstein, 1960)
 Proprioseiopsis sosninae (Wainstein, 1972)
 Proprioseiopsis synachattiensis (Gupta, 1985)
 Proprioseiopsis temperellus (Denmark & Muma, 1967)
 Proprioseiopsis temperus Tuttle & Muma, 1973
 Proprioseiopsis tenax (De Leon, 1967)
 Proprioseiopsis terrestris (Chant, 1959)
 Proprioseiopsis trilobae Denmark & Evans, in Denmark, Evans, Aguilar, Vargas & Ochoa 1999
 Proprioseiopsis tropicanus (Garman, 1958)
 Proprioseiopsis tubulus (Muma, 1965)
 Proprioseiopsis tulearensis (Blommers, 1976)
 Proprioseiopsis umidus Karg, 1989
 Proprioseiopsis unicus Denmark & Knisley, in Knisley & Denmark 1978
 Proprioseiopsis variocaudarum Karg, 1993
 Proprioseiopsis versutus (Zack, 1969)
 Proprioseiopsis vitreus Karg, 1998
 Proprioseiopsis vulgaris (Schuh, 1960)
 Proprioseiopsis weintraubi (Chant & Hansell, 1971)

References

Phytoseiidae